Basanta Utsav is a 2013 Bengali film directed by Rhitobrata Bhattacharya. Holi, the Indian festival is the backdrop of the film. There are five different stories in the film.

Plot 
Basanta Utsav is an anthology of five independently shot films that revolve around love, desire, and relationships. The stories are written by Samantak Ghosh and Rhitobrata.

Cast 
 Parambrata Chatterjee
 Pijush Ganguly
 Paoli Dam
 Swastika Mukherjee
 Rudranil Ghosh
 Gargi RoyChowdhury

See also 
 Bye Bye Bangkok

References 

Bengali-language Indian films
2010s Bengali-language films
2013 films
Indian anthology films